= Albanian National Alliance Party =

Political party in Albania

- Leader: Eduart Perjaku
- Founded: 2003

Albanian National Alliance Party (in Albanian: Partia Aleanca Nacionale Shqiptare) is a political party in Albania led by Eduart Perjaku. The party was recognized by the Electoral Commission in 2003.
